The 1945 Outer Banks hurricane was a moderate hurricane that struck Florida and affected the East Coast of the United States in late June, 1945. The first tropical storm and the first hurricane of the Atlantic season, it developed on June 20 in the western Caribbean Sea off Honduras. For the next two days, it moved generally northward into the Gulf of Mexico. Reaching hurricane intensity on June 23, it then turned northeast toward the Florida peninsula. It made landfall in the Big Bend on June 24, then weakened to a tropical storm over land. Minor damage was reported in Florida, but the storm produced heavy, though beneficial, rains that eased one of the state's worst recorded droughts. Upon entering the Atlantic Ocean, it re-intensified into a hurricane and paralleled the East Coast. On June 26, it struck the Outer Banks of North Carolina as a minimal hurricane, producing minor damage but heavy rainfall.

Continuing northeast, the cyclone delivered gale-force winds to New York and southern New England, causing traffic accidents and minor wind damage. Heavy rains drenched the area, and high waves offshore caused ships to need rescue. One man died in a traffic accident; some people were rescued on Long Island Sound. The U.S. Coast Guard sought to escort ships at sea into safe harbor. Overall, the impact of the storm was minor, though temperatures fell almost  the day after the storm.

Meteorological history

On June 19, a tropical disturbance was detected between Swan Island and the Honduran coast. However, surface data in the vicinity did not indicate a closed circulation until 12 UTC on June 20. Reanalysis by the Hurricane Research Division in 2013, however, determined that a tropical storm formed farther northwest, near 19°N 86°W. Squally weather, and winds of moderate tropical storm force, was reported in connection with the tropical storm as it moved generally northward, toward the Yucatán Channel. Little strengthening occurred over the next two days, until after 12 UTC on June 22. At the same time, its track made a sharp bend toward the northeast, threatening the Florida peninsula. As with most early reconnaissance data, such readings are suspect; however, based upon the reconnaissance measurement, the storm was originally listed in the Atlantic hurricane database as a Category 3 hurricane. After peaking late on June 23, the storm quickly lost intensity.

The hurricane continued northeast and made landfall at 08 UTC on June 24, north of the Tampa Bay Area. After making landfall, the center tracked inland between Brooksville and Dunnellon, near the Hernando–Citrus county line. About an hour before 18 UTC, the cyclone returned to water off the Atlantic coast of Florida, passing between St. Augustine and Daytona Beach.

After moving offshore, however, the cyclone quickly regained force. Within seven hours, it re-intensified into a minimal hurricane and paralleled the Southeastern United States, following the warm Gulf Stream. Early on June 26, the northeast-moving hurricane approached the North Carolina coast, and made a second landfall at 01 UTC near Beaufort, North Carolina. Passing very near to Cape Hatteras, the eye of the storm moved offshore at Oregon Inlet, near Wanchese. The storm maintained hurricane intensity as it moved over and northeast of the Outer Banks. At 06 UTC on June 27, the cyclone finally lost tropical characteristics, but still retained winds of hurricane force for another 12 hours. The system survived another four days, only to lose its identity near Iceland at 12 UTC on July 4.

Preparations and impact
As early as June 19, the U.S. Weather Bureau began sending reconnaissance missions to monitor the developing storm in the Caribbean. The regular reports sent by the airplanes provided valuable data about the intensity of the small cyclone.  At 16 UTC (10:00 a.m. local time) on June 23, the U.S. Weather Bureau in New Orleans advised residents from Mobile, Alabama, to Cedar Key, Florida, to prepare for gale-force winds. Areas from Tampa to Grand Isle, Louisiana, were placed under a storm warning. The center of the storm was expected to strike land early on June 24 between Mobile and Panama City, Florida.  As the storm intensified into a hurricane, forecasters shifted their predicted landfall point eastward; early on June 24 the Weather Bureau expected the storm to strike between Tampa and Cross City, Florida. Hurricane warnings were issued for the coastline between Tampa and Carrabelle, Florida; meanwhile, storm warnings were issued from Punta Gorda to Titusville. The city of Tallahassee prepared to receive evacuees, and evacuations were ordered for coastal communities in the Big Bend. The Florida Highway Patrol warned local residents to leave the area, and soldiers were transported out of Carrabelle. As the hurricane moved closer to the Big Bend, storm warnings were extended up the Eastern Seaboard to Savannah, Georgia. Between 300 and 400 military aircraft were flown out of Florida to Birmingham, Alabama. Once the storm left Florida, additional evacuations commenced between Georgetown, South Carolina, and Cape Hatteras, including the North Carolina communities of Wilmington, Morehead City, and nearby resort towns. Large-scale evacuations from the Wilmington area alone involved 5,000 people and were credited with reducing loss of life. Meanwhile, storm warnings were extended northward to Norfolk, Virginia; however, only minor impacts occurred in Carolinas and Virginia.  Nevertheless, the cyclone continued to parallel the East Coast, so storm warnings were eventually extended to Atlantic City, New Jersey; small watercraft in the Northeastern United States were advised to stay in port.

Winds in the Tampa Bay Area reached tropical storm force, at 05 UTC on June 24. Near the point of landfall, the hurricane defoliated citrus trees and downed power lines, and flash floods washed out roadways. Throughout its path, the hurricane generated prolific rains. Peak rainfall along the path totaled  at Lake Alfred; West Palm Beach recorded  of rain within a 24-hour period. Rainfall in Orange County exceeded , which proved beneficial to dry orange groves; the heavy rains ended one of the worst droughts in Florida's history. Overall, damage in the Miami area was described as being slight, totaling $75,000 (1945 USD). The hurricane also produced two tornadoes in Florida, one near LaBelle and another near Melbourne. Along the Georgia coast, the hurricane produced only fringe impacts, including strong winds and heavy rain.

The Coast Guard nevertheless sought to escort troubled ships into port. The heavy rains and gale-force winds hindered normal traffic; a vehicle struck and killed a man at Warwick, Rhode Island. At least 10,000 telephone lines were taken out of service, 7,000 of them in the Cape Cod region. Besides causing power outages, the stormy conditions damaged trees, buildings, and crops; in the Boston area, high winds knocked down trees and chimneys. A strong temperature gradient existed between the cyclone and the Northeast U.S.: in New York City, the daily high on June 26 was almost 20° F lower than on the preceding day.

See also
 List of North Carolina hurricanes
 Hurricane Allison (1995)
 Tropical Storm Andrea (2013)
 Hurricane Arthur (2014)

References

Outer
1945 Outer
1945 Outer
1945 Outer
Outer Banks Hurricane, 1945
1945 natural disasters in the United States
1944 in Florida
1944 in North Carolina
June 1945 events in the United States
July 1945 events in the United States